"Jungle Love" is a 1977 song by the Steve Miller Band, featured on the album Book of Dreams. It was written by Lonnie Turner (longtime bass player for the Steve Miller Band) and Greg Douglass (a well-known San Francisco sideman who also played with Hot Tuna and Greg Kihn, among many others). It reached  on the Billboard Hot 100.

According to Greg Douglass, Turner and Douglass originally wrote the song for Dave Mason. Turner gave a demo of the record to Miller, who liked it, and the Steve Miller Band (with Douglass playing guitar) recorded it in 30 minutes on the last day of recording for Book of Dreams.

Cash Box called it "a hard-rocking, energetic tune" and said that "the vocal here is delivered with a shout, but carefully orchestrated instruments, especially the organ, make a clear statement of each melodic hook."  Record World called it an "up-beat, well-produced single-with a synthesizer opening."

Guitar tuning
Greg Douglass' guitar is tuned to 'Open A' (which is, low to high, E-A-E-A-C#-E). It is the only guitar on the studio recording.

Chart history

Weekly charts

Year-end charts

In television
"Jungle Love" has been used on multiple occasions in the television series Everybody Loves Raymond. It was featured on the season 6 episode "Snow Day", which aired January 14, 2002: at the end, all the characters, except Marie and Frank, chaotically danced to the song. The song was then used as the opening credits theme music in seasons 7-9.

References

External links
 

1977 songs
1977 singles
Steve Miller Band songs
Capitol Records singles
Song recordings produced by Steve Miller